Outrigger Resorts & Hotels is a Honolulu-based luxury hotel chain and management company that operates hotels, condominiums, and vacation resort properties in Hawaii, the Asia-Pacific region, and the islands of the Indian Ocean.

History
The company was founded by Roy and Estelle Kelley who opened their first hotel in 1947. Roy Kelley was an architect for Charles William Dickey and worked on many of Honolulu's landmark buildings, including the Immigration Station, Montegue Hall at Punahou School, the main building of the old Halekulani Hotel and the former Waikiki Theater.

In 1963, Roy Kelley bought the old Outrigger Canoe Club from the estate of Queen Emma of Hawaii and built the Outrigger Waikiki in this site. In 1967, the Outrigger Waikiki On The Beach hotel opened, the first to carry the Outrigger name. During the 1970s, Outrigger grew into a chain of Hawaiian hotels. In 1982, the company purchased the Prince Kuhio Hotel, its first luxury property. By 1986, Outrigger became the largest hotel chain in Hawaii when its room count pushed over 7,000. In 1989, Outrigger took over the Royal Waikoloan Hotel, and in 1993, the Kauai Hilton became the Outrigger Kauai Beach hotel. In 1996, Outrigger opened its first hotel outside the United States, the Outrigger Marshall Islands Resort.

In 1999, Outrigger spun off 15 of its hotels to create the hotel chain OHANA Hotels and Resorts, a brand of three-star properties, while also keeping the Outrigger brand for its higher-end five-star and luxury properties. Ohana is a Hawaiian word meaning "family". By 2018, there were only two remaining OHANA Hotels.

By 2014, the hotel chain operated 11,000 rooms in 40 hotels worldwide and added 2 Fiji hotels to its list of properties.

In March 2016, Outrigger sold its four Australian hotels to the Mantra Group. In November 2016, the company entered into an agreement to be acquired by an affiliate of KSL Capital Partners, a Denver, Colorado based firm that specializes in travel and leisure investments. Outrigger's portfolio includes 38 hotels, condominiums and vacation resort properties operated, owned and managed. Jeff Wagoner joined the company as president and CEO, effective April 26, 2018. As well, KSL Resorts Co-founder and CEO Scott Dalecio, who was serving as Outrigger’s interim CEO since early 2017, was appointed executive chairman of the global hospitality brand.

External links

References

Hotel chains in the United States
Companies based in Hawaii
Hospitality companies of the United States
1947 establishments in Hawaii
Hotels established in 1947
2016 mergers and acquisitions